This is a list of notable people of Georgian Azerbaijani descent.

Art

Politicians

Military

Sport

Scientific

References

Azerbaijanis
Georgian
Azerbaijani